is a Japanese manga series written and illustrated by Masakazu Katsura. It was serialized in Shueisha's Weekly Shōnen Jump magazine between August 1993 and July 1994, spanning 42 chapters collected in a total of five tankōbon volumes.

DNA² was adapted into a 12-episode anime television series by Madhouse and Studio Deen, broadcast on Nippon Television from October to December 1994. This was followed by a three-episode anime original video animation (OVA) in 1995. The anime TV series and the OVA were licensed in North America by Central Park Media. Discotek Media has since re-licensed the series for a DVD release in 2014.

Plot
Junta Momonari is a high school student with a very unusual problem. Whenever he becomes sexually aroused by a woman, his "female allergy" kicks in, causing him to throw up. One day, Junta is confronted by a girl in strange clothing who claims to be from the future. The girl, called Karin Aoi, tells him about how the world has become terribly overpopulated in her time, to the point where having more than one child is a crime punishable by death. At the root of the problem is a family of "Mega-Playboys": people with sexual charisma and impulses that lead each of them to have 100 children that carry the Mega-Playboy DNA, causing them and all their descendants to each have 100 children as well. All this started with a single Mega-Playboy, whom Karin has travelled back into the past to deal with. Karin reveals to Junta that she is a "DNA Operator". Her job is to make alterations in people's DNA that will change their nature for the greater good of society. She intends to shoot the original Mega-Playboy with a DCM ("DNA Control Medicine") bullet that will alter his DNA in order to relieve him of his mega-playboy qualities, thus preventing the overpopulation problem from ever happening. She can then return to the future to receive the reward that will allow her to finally get the "nice husband, cute pet, and sweet, sweet home" she yearns for. She confirms Junta's identity, then, to his shock, promptly shoots him.

Junta, the boy who could not look at a naked woman without throwing up, was destined to become the original Mega-Playboy later in his life. Escaping back to her time machine, Karin arrives to a message from her boss in the future. Her hopes for a commendation on a job well done are dashed when her rather upset employer points out that the DCM bullet she was supposed to use on the Mega-Playboy was left behind in the future. By shooting Junta with the wrong DCM bullet—one which Karin planned on using to create an ideal husband—rather than eliminating the Mega-Playboy, Karin actually created him. Now unable to return to the future until she sets things right, Karin decides to improvise by making Junta get together with the only girl who does not give him an allergic reaction: his childhood friend Ami Kurimoto, for whom he does not feel any romantic affection, since he sees her more as a sister.

Characters

A high school boy with a peculiar allergy to girls: he vomits when sexually aroused. He gains the ability to transform into the Mega-Playboy, practically at will, after being shot by Karin's first DCM bullet. However, each time he transforms, his Mega-Playboy DNA stabilizes more and more.

A sixteen-year-old DNA Operator from the overcrowded future, sent back in time in order to prevent the advent of the Mega-Playboy using DCM, however she brings back the wrong bullet from the future which accelerates Junta in becoming the Mega-Playboy. All she wants out of life is a nice husband, a cute pet, and a sweet home, but when she met Junta, she falls in love with him–at first because of his Mega-Playboy powers, and finally because of him as a person.

Junta's childhood friend and schoolmate, and, except for two instances, the only girl who doesn't bring about an allergic reaction in him. She is also the only girl immune to the Mega-Playboy's ability to seduce women, something Karin considers a key part in the plan to stop the Mega-Playboy. If Junta and Ami stay together, she can nullify the Mega-Playboy's charms and the future won't be overcrowded.

One of the most popular and beautiful girls in Junta's school, and the ex-girlfriend of Ryuji. She falls in love with Junta because of his Mega-Playboy powers. Apart from this, she's a quite lonely girl; her mother died and her father works abroad.

Tomoko's wealthy and possessive ex-boyfriend. Swears vengeance against Junta. Later gains powers that rival those of the Mega-Playboy after being accidentally shot by a second DCM bullet.

A friend and classmate of Ami's who has an embarrassing problem similar to Junta's allergy: she farts whenever she gets nervous. Kotomi develops a crush on Junta due to his Mega-Playboy DNA. She and Junta spend some time together trying to help cure each other of their problems. She's very talented in gymnastics.

Karin's boss from the future.

The AI of Karin's time traveling ship.

The Mega-Playboy's youngest daughter and Junta's 101st child (counting 純). In the anime, she is Junta's great-granddaughter.

A government official from the future who wishes to use the Mega-Playboy and his descendants for his own purposes.

A friend of Junta who often pokes fun at Junta's bad luck with girls.

Another one of Junta's friends.

Junta's mother, she has raised him alone after being widowed. A kind woman, if somewhat of a meddler and tattletale sometimes.

Competitor with Kotomi in gymnastics, tried to remove her competition with the help of her brother, a psychic interested in Junta's psychic soldier abilities.

Media

Manga
The DNA² manga was published in Japanese magazine Weekly Shōnen Jump 1993 No. 36 (August 23, 1993) through 1994 No. 29 (July 4, 1994) and consists of 42 chapters collected by Shueisha in 5 tankōbon volumes:

Volume list

Anime

Episode list

References

External links

1993 manga
1994 anime television series debuts
1995 anime OVAs
Anime and manga about time travel
Central Park Media
Discotek Media
Madhouse (company)
Masakazu Katsura
Romantic comedy anime and manga
Science fiction anime and manga
Shōnen manga
Shueisha manga
Studio Deen